The Mikoyan MiG-29K (NATO reporting name: Fulcrum-D) is a Russian all-weather carrier-based multirole fighter aircraft developed by the Mikoyan Design Bureau. The MiG-29K was developed in the late 1980s from the MiG-29M. Mikoyan describes it as a 4+ generation aircraft.

Production standard MiG-29Ks differ from prototypes in features such as a multi-function radar and several new cockpit displays; the adoption of HOTAS (hands-on-throttle-and-stick) controls; the integration of RVV-AE (also known as R-77) air-to-air missiles, along with missiles for anti-ship and anti-radar operations; and several ground/strike precision-guided weapons.

The MiG-29K was not ordered into production and only two prototypes were originally built because the Russian Navy preferred the Su-27K (later re-designated Su-33) in the early 1990s. Mikoyan did not stop its work on the MiG-29K aircraft despite the lack of financing since 1992. The programme got a boost in the late 1990s to meet an Indian requirement for a ship-borne fighter following the purchase of a former Soviet aircraft carrier, and the MiG-29K was first received by the Indian Naval Air Arm in 2009. The Russian Navy, with their Su-33s nearing the end of their service lives by 2010, has also ordered the MiG-29K as a replacement.

Development

Origins
The MiG-29K project was initiated in the late 1970s when the Soviet Navy developed a requirement for a supersonic carrier-based fighter. As a first step to meet this requirement, the Mikoyan design bureau designed a "proof of concept" version of the MiG-29 fitted with a stronger undercarriage and a reinforced tail section with an arrestor hook, the MiG-29KVP (Korotkii Vzlet i Posadka, or "short take off and landing"). The KVP first flew on 21 August 1982, and was subject to extensive trials which demonstrated it could safely operate from a ski-jump, but ideally a production aircraft needed more power and greater wing area. It was decided to base the definitive naval version on the advanced MiG-29M (izdeliye "Product" 9.15) that was already under development, further modified with new undercarriage and folding wings of greater area, with the new model designated the MiG-29K (Korabelniy – "ship based") or Project 9–31. The MiG-29K differed considerably from the MiG-29 production model, featuring a new multi-function radar, dubbed Zhuk; a cockpit with monochrome display and use of the HOTAS (hands-on-throttle-and-stick) principle; the RVV-AE air-to-air active homing missiles; antiship and antiradar missiles; as well as air-to-ground precision-guided weapons. To protect the engine from foreign object damage (FOD), the engine inlets were fitted with retractable grills for air flow, rather than metal doors and leading-edge extension auxiliary intake louvres used by land-based MiG-29s.

The MiG-29Ks first flight was performed on 23 July 1988 at Saky by test pilot Toktar Aubakirov. On 1 November 1989, on the same day as the Sukhoi Su-27K, Aubakirov executed the first carrier landing of MiG-29K on the aircraft-carrying cruiser Tbilisi (now known as Admiral Kuznetsov), the first take-off from the carrier's deck was successfully performed the same day. During 1989–1991, the MiG-29K underwent further tests aboard Admiral Kuznetsov. The project was put on hold with the collapse of the Soviet Union, while the Russian Navy only pursued the rival Su-33. Mikoyan continued work on the MiG-29K despite the lack of funding.

According to the results of the tests, the landing accuracy proved to be very high, which made it possible at a later stage to switch over to a three-cable arrester system on Admiral Gorshkov. The landing accuracy is additionally enhanced through the employment of an autothrottle system.

Revival

The MiG-29K programme was revived in response to the decision of the Indian Navy to acquire the former Soviet Navy aircraft carrier Admiral Gorshkov in 2004. When Admiral Gorshkov was part of the Soviet fleet, it was a hybrid aircraft carrier/cruiser using vertical take-off (V/STOL) aircraft; thus the deck was refurbished with a take-off ramp and arrestor wires for operating MiG-29Ks. The aircraft has an enlarged and folding wing, an arrestor hook and a corrosion-protected reinforced fuselage.

One factor favouring the MiG-29K over the Su-33 in the Indian decision was the larger size of the Su-33, which further limited the number of aircraft on deck. It is compatible with the full range of weapons carried by the MiG-29M and MiG-29SMT.

The problem of lack of aircraft-carrier based AWACS platform may be tackled by further development of dual-seat MiG-29KUB. It is theoretically possible to outfit the MiG-29KUB with powerful radar, and encrypted data links, to permit networking of multiple MiG-29KUB aircraft for AEW coverage. The MiG-29KUB may also be enhanced in areas such as electronic warfare and long-range interdiction.

The MiG-29KUB two-seat variant took its first flight on 20 January 2007, followed by the MiG-29K on 25 June 2007.

Design

The MiG-29K is drastically modified from the Mikoyan MiG-29M for naval operations. The airframe and undercarriage are reinforced to withstand the stress experienced upon landing. Folding wings, an arrestor hook, and catapult attachments were added for carrier operations; the aircraft's undercarriage track was also widened. The MiG-29K, unlike the early MiG-29, can both conduct aerial refueling and "buddy" refuel other aircraft.

The MiG-29K has two widely spaced RD-33MKs. The early prototypes were fitted with two RD-33K turbofan engines, each with afterburner thrust of 86.3 kN (19,800 lb) and a possible take-off thrust of 92.2 kN (20,723 lbf) for shipborne operations. The RD-33MK engine features 7% higher power over the base RD-33, enabled by the usage of improved materials for the turbine blades.

The MiG-29KUB two-seat fighter, intended for pilot training, can also conduct combat missions identical to the single-seat fighter.

Cockpit and avionics 

The aircraft is equipped with three multifunctional color liquid-crystal displays (seven LCDs on the MiG-29KUB), a four-channel digital fly-by-wire flight control system, passive homing system for anti-radar missiles, Sigma-95 GPS receiver, TopGun helmet-mounted targeting system and electronic countermeasures (ECM). Additionally, an onboard oxygen generating system eliminates the need for heavy oxygen canisters. The types of combat missions undertaken by the MiG-29K can be increased by adding optronic/infrared imaging reconnaissance pods.

The Zhuk-ME is a development of the N010 Zhuk radar, introducing functions such as terrain mapping and following. The radar, weighing , features improved signal processing and a detection range of up to  vs a 5 m2 RCS target for the export variant. In the air targeting mode, up to ten targets can be tracked and four targets engaged simultaneously. The radar has a scanning area of ±85 degrees in azimuth and +56/-40 in elevation.

The Zhuk-AE radar was developed with modular approach, enabling upgrade of existing Zhuk ME radars deployed in MiG-29 platforms into the active electronically scanned array (AESA) Zhuk-AE standard. India is already operating the Bars phased array radar on its Su-30MKI and has specified AESA as a critical element of the MRCA platform. The MiG-29K can be outfitted with an IRST system integrated with both optical and laser systems. The IRST can also provide detailed trajectories of missiles at closer ranges.

Weapons and defensive capabilities

MiG-29K has a GSh-30-1 30 mm cannon in the port wing root. It has provisions for laser-guided and electro-optical bombs, as well as air-to-surface missiles like Kh-25ML/25MP, Kh-29T, Kh-31G/31A, Kh-35U, and rockets. Kh-31P passive radar seeker missiles are used as anti-radiation missiles.  Kh-35, Kh-31A antiship missiles are for anti-ship roles; for aerial combat air-to-air missile like RVV-AE, R-27ER/ET and R-73E are fitted. The aircraft is also adaptable to various foreign weapons.

The MiG-29K has a combination of low-observable technology, advanced electronic-warfare capabilities, reduced ballistic vulnerability, and standoff weapons to enhance the fighter's survivability. According to Mikoyan, extensive use of radar-absorbent materials reduce the MiG-29K's radar signature 4–5 times over the basic MiG-29. The RD-33MK turbofan engine was also engineered to reduce infrared signature and improve aircraft camouflage.

Operational history

India

In 2004 India ordered 12 MiG-29K single-seat and 4 MiG-29KUB two-seat fighters. The MiG-29K is to provide both airborne fleet air defence and surface attack capabilities. Deliveries began in December 2009. Prior to their delivery to India, the MiG-29Ks underwent testing on board . In January 2010, India and Russia signed a deal worth US$1.2 billion for the Indian Navy to receive an additional 29 MiG-29Ks. The MiG-29K entered operational service with India in February 2010. Further deliveries of five MiG-29Ks and a flight simulator took place in May 2011. Further deliveries are to continue through 2012. Vikramaditya was expected to carry up to 24 MiG-29K/KUB fighters. The future indigenous aircraft carrier , being built by India, is also likely to carry these aircraft.

Further MiG-29K orders by India were frozen after a MiG-29KUB crashed during testing in Russia prior to delivery to India; the Indian Defence Ministry commented that the crash cast a shadow on the credibility of the aircraft. Russia later announced that pilot error had caused the crash, and there was no need to ground the aircraft. In August 2011, MiG's General Director Sergei Korotkov announced that the final five out of the 16 aircraft contracted in 2004 would be delivered by the end of the year; and that deliveries of a second batch of 29 MiG-29Ks would begin in 2012. In November 2012, the MiG-29K/KUB completed sea trials for the Indian Navy. One problem is that Western and Ukrainian sanctions on Russia have prevented Mikoyan importing components for assembly at the factory, instead they have had to be installed "on the flightline" in India.

In a 2016 report, India's national auditor CAG criticized the aircraft due to defects in engines, airframes and fly-by-wire systems. The serviceability of MiG-29K was reported ranging from 15.93% to 37.63% and that of MiG-29KUB ranging from 21.30% to 47.14%; with 40 engines (62%) being rejected/withdrawn from service due to design defects. These defects are likely to reduce the service life of the aircraft from the stated 6000 hours. However, it was reported that recent efforts made by the two countries have improved serviceability to around 70%. In 2017, the Indian government announced the planned replacement of the MiG-29 with 57 new aircraft, with a competition primarily between the French Dassault Rafale and the American Boeing F/A-18E/F Super Hornet.

In December 2018 when addressing the press on the eve of Navy Day CNS Admiral Lanba noted regarding the MiG-29K, "there is no issue on supplies of spare parts from Russia at the moment... The MiG-29K fleet has been performing well now."  The Indian Navy plans to deploy the MiG-29K onboard its first domestically built carrier, the INS Vikrant, and will acquire further combat jets with updated capabilities for this purpose. Indian Navy Chief Admiral Sunil Lanba announced that issues related to maintenance and availability of spare parts for the MiG-29K fleet, which had previously undermined their readiness, had been resolved.

Russia

The 279th Shipborne Fighter Aviation Regiment of the Russian Navy has a fleet of 21 Su-33 fighters whose service lives were expected to be reached by 2015. Around 10 to 12 will receive an upgrade including the Gefest SVP-24 bombsight for free-fall bombs, giving them a limited ground attack capability, but more aircraft were needed. It was less cost-effective to open the Su-33 production line for a small run than to piggy-back on the Indian Navy's order of MiG-29K's. India paid $730 million for the development and delivery of 16 units, while 24 for the Russian Navy would cost approximately $1 billion.

The Russian Navy ordered 24 MiG-29Ks in late 2009 for Admiral Kuznetsov. Deliveries of the MiG-29K for the Russian Navy started in 2010. MiG and Russia were in final negotiations for an order for more MiG-29K/KUB aircraft in August 2011. An order for 20 MiG-29KR fighter-bombers and four MiG-29KUBR operational trainers for operation from Admiral Kuznetsov, replacing the Sukhoi Su-33, was officially announced in February 2012. However, in 2015, Major-General Igor Kozhin, the Commander of the Navy's Air and Air Defence Forces, announced that a second fighter regiment would be formed to augment the current force, with the intention that the MiG-29s be used by this new unit, with some existing Su-33s refurbished for further use.

In October 2016, four MiG-29KR/KUBR from the 100th Independent Shipborne Fighter Aviation Regiment formed part of the air group aboard Admiral Kuznetsov as the ship deployed with its battle group to the Mediterranean Sea as part of the Russian campaign in Syria. On 13 November 2016, a MiG-29KUBR on operations in the Mediterranean crashed en route back to Admiral Kuznetsov.

Variants
MiG-29K
Indian single seat variant.
MiG-29KR
Russian single seat variant, replaces Ukrainian and Indian equipment with Russian. 
MiG-29KUB
Indian tandem two-seat operational trainer variant.
MiG-29KUBR
Russian tandem two-seat operational trainer variant.
MiG-29KVP
(KVP – Korotkaya Vzlet Posadka – Short take-off landing (STOL)) Several aircraft converted to article 9–12 standard, (or 9–18?), with high-lift systems strengthened undercarriage and arrestor hook, for research into deck landings and pilot training.

Operators

 Indian Navy – 45 MiG-29K/KUB aircraft in its inventory. India ordered the fighters within the framework of two contract signing in 2004 and 2010. The last aircraft was delivered in February 2017.
Indian Naval Air Arm 
300 Indian Naval Air Squadron – , Goa
 303 Indian Naval Air Squadron – INS Hansa, Goa (embarked in )

 Russian Navy – ordered 20 MiG-29KR and 4 MiG-29KUBR in 2012. All the aircraft were delivered by early 2016.
 Russian Naval Aviation
 100th Independent Shipborne Fighter Aviation Regiment – Yeysk (air base), Krasnodar Krai

Accidents

 On 23 June 2011, a MiG-29KUB crashed during testing in Russia, prior to delivery to India, killing its two pilots.
 On 13 November 2016, a MiG-29KUBR crashed in the Mediterranean Sea while returning to the aircraft carrier Admiral Kuznetsov from a mission over Syria. The pilot was reportedly rescued.
 In November 2019, an Indian Navy MiG-29KUB trainer aircraft crashed after engine failure and both pilots ejected safely. 
 In February 2020, an Indian Navy MiG-29KUB trainer aircraft crashed and both pilots ejected safely.
 On 26 November 2020, an Indian Navy MiG-29KUB trainer aircraft crashed into sea with one pilot dead.
 On 12 October 2022, an Indian Navy MiG-29K aircraft off INS Hansa crashed off the coast of Goa in the sea and pilot was rescued.

Specifications (MiG-29K - Izdeliye 9.41)

See also

References
Notes

Citations

Bibliography

 Bangash, M.Y.H. Shock, Impact and Explosion: Structural Analysis and Design. Springer, 2008. .
 Belyakov, R.A. and Marmain, J. MiG: Fifty Years of Secret Aircraft Design. Shrewsbury, UK:Airlife, 1994. .
 Conley, Jerome M. Indo-Russian military and nuclear cooperation: lessons and options for U.S. policy in South Asia. Lexington Books, 2001. .
 Day, Jerry. "Hot Hot Hot!" Air Classics, Volume 45, Issue 4, April 2009.
 
 
 Gordon, Yefim and Peter Davison. Mikoyan Gurevich MiG-29 Fulcrum. North Branch, Minnesota: Specialty Press, 2005. .
 
 Gunston, Bill and Yefim Gordon. MiG aircraft since 1937. North Branch, Minnesota: Naval Institute Press, 1998. .
 Lake, Jon. Jane's How to Fly and Fight in the Mikoyan MiG-29. New York: HarperCollins, 1997. .
 Rininger, Tyson V. Red Flag: Air Combat for the 21st Century. Grand Rapids, Michigan: Zenith Imprint, 2006. .

External links

 MiG-29K/KUB page on Migavia.ru
 MiG-29K page on Globalsecurity.org

MiG-029K
Carrier-based aircraft
1990s Soviet and Russian fighter aircraft
Twinjets
Aircraft first flown in 1988
Twin-tail aircraft